The 1933–34 Scottish Second Division was the second tier football league of Scotland that was won by Albion Rovers who, along with second placed Dunfermline Athletic, were promoted to the First Division. Edinburgh City finished bottom.

Table

References 

 Scottish Football Archive

Scottish Division Two seasons
2
Scot